Clement Tudway (1734–1815) was a British lawyer and politician who sat in the House of Commons for 54 years from  1761 to 1815, being Father of the House from 1806.

Tudway was the eldest son of Charles Tudway and his wife  Hannah. He matriculated at Oriel College, Oxford in 1751. In 1752 he entered Middle Temple 1752 and was called to the bar in 1759. He married Elizabeth Hill, daughter of Sir Rowland Hill, 1st Baronet on 7 June 1762. In 1770, he succeeded his father. He became recorder of Wells and was Mayor of Wells ten times.
 
Tudway was returned unopposed as Member of Parliament for Wells on his father's interest at the 1761 general election. At the 1768 general election there was a contest at Wells, but he topped the poll because his father could command enough votes. He was also returned as MP for Midhurst as a Government candidate at the 1774 general election but decided to sit for Wells where he was returned unopposed. By 1806 he was the longest standing MP in the House, but by this time his absences though ill-health were becoming frequent.
 
Tudway died while still an MP on 7 July 1815. He and his wife Elizabeth had no children.

References

1734 births
1815 deaths
People from Somerset
Members of the Parliament of Great Britain for English constituencies
British MPs 1761–1768
British MPs 1768–1774
British MPs 1774–1780
British MPs 1780–1784
British MPs 1784–1790
British MPs 1790–1796
British MPs 1796–1800
Members of the Parliament of the United Kingdom for English constituencies
UK MPs 1801–1802
UK MPs 1802–1806
UK MPs 1806–1807
UK MPs 1807–1812
UK MPs 1812–1818